Kowloon City Ferry Pier is a ferry pier in Ma Tau Kok, Kowloon, Hong Kong. It is at the north of Hoi Sham Park and the east of East Kowloon Corridor.

History 
The pier started operation in 1956 and was the first permanent pier in Hong Kong built after World War II. It had ferry services to Wan Chai, North Point and Tai Koo Shing (later Sai Wan Ho) and a vehicular ferry service to North Point (ceased operation in 1998).

Current transportation 
The pier currently has only one ferry service, to North Point, operated by New World First Ferry. There is a bus terminus outside the pier.

References

Piers in Hong Kong
Victoria Harbour
Ma Tau Kok